KWBT (94.5 MHz) is an FM radio station broadcasting an urban contemporary radio format. KWBT HD2 broadcasts a national Sports Talk format from CBS Sports Radio, branded as "CBS Sports 94.5 HD2."

KWBT is licensed to Waco, Texas, United States, and the station serves the Waco metropolitan area. The station is owned by Jerry and Loy Lenamon, through licensee Kennelwood Radio, LLC. KWBT's studios are located in Waco, and its transmitter is located off Beverley Drive near the Waco VA Hospital.

Programming
94.5 The Beat, using the slogan "Central Texas' #1 for Hip Hop and R&B," is often a leader in the Nielsen ratings.  With a successful nighttime show, The Tite at Nite Crew, hosted by BKLYN W/2oz & DJ ADezzy. Brooklyn and ADezzy feature gossip, games, music and conversation.  KWBT also features local disc jockeys, DJ Precyse and Jazze.  KWBT carries The Steve Harvey Morning Show, the DL Hughley Show and Keith Sweat's "Sweat Hotel," all syndicated by Premiere Radio Networks.

History
The station went on the air as KANF on August 11, 1995. On September 8, 1995, the station changed its call sign to the KBCT.

On December 31, 2013, the KWBT call letters and Urban Contemporary format on 104.9 in Bellmead, Texas, moved to 94.5 while 104.9 FM became KBHT, which in turn launched an Adult Hits format.

The station had planned to launch their HD2 feed on FM translator station K231CG in early October 2018, however the launch was delayed to the end of October due to "engineering and recent weather issues". On December 21, 2018, the Federal Communications Commission rescinded K231CG's broadcast license, as it had never properly been constructed before the expiration of its construction permit in 2016.

References

External links

WBT (FM)
Urban contemporary radio stations in the United States